The Bee Branch Creek, formerly known as Couler Creek, is a tributary of the Mississippi River found in Dubuque, Iowa. The creek starts in the west of Dubuque before flowing into the Couler Valley and then into the downtown. Due to its involvement in multiple disasters, particularly floods, the Bee Branch Creek has become an interest for Dubuque.

After the Upper Bee Branch and Lower Bee Branch projects, the creek has become a daylighted stream with parks and trails along its banks. It has been estimated to have prevented millions of dollars in damages. The Bee Branch has also been involved with numerous ecological projects. Despite being recently daylighted, the Iowa DNR diagnosed the creek with a healthy ecosystem.

Etymology
It is unknown how the Bee Branch got its name, however, it is believed to be a name for a lower tributary of the creek. Earlier, the creek went by Couler Creek, named after Couler Valley and Couler Village, which could come from the French  or "to flow". The name Bee Branch was in use by 1863; though, the name existed before then, and Couler Creek remained in use for a long time afterward, being used in 1959 and 1997 geological surveys.

History

Early history 
The Couler Creek saw many floods, inhibiting growth in the city in the 19th century. In 1877, a plan to alter the course of the Bee Branch north to the Little Maquoketa River was made. After a flood in 1878, opinion was swayed into directing the Bee Branch into the Little Maquoketa. The year 1885 saw the Dubuque and Northwestern Railroad acquire right of way along Elm street and the Bee Branch causing an increase of development. 

The chosen idea in the end was putting the creek through a sewer. An advantage of the storm sewer would allow for Elm Street to be expanded. In late 1898, the city council hired J. H. Blake to plan out the sewer. The Chicago, Milwaukee & St. Paul Railway aided in the construction of the sewer as their yards straddled the creek. In 1902, the Chicago Great Western Railway attempted to impede the construction of the sewer, requesting a heavier sewer system under its tracks. Due to the franchise being up for the renewal, the attempt from the railway failed. An ordinance was made and was finalized, putting the sewer under Elm Street, allowing for the railroads second line, and pledged the city to build the line further north. The railroad would build the Elm Street Sewer and the pledged work would be finished by the latter part of 1905. 

The sewer was critically acclaimed by the Dubuque Enterprise newspaper due to a sewer allowing for the north to be developed as the Bee Branch had blocked off the north end of the city. The upstream portions remained open until 1915 and some parts of the creek were not closed until 1920. By the mid 20th century, the creek was seen as insignificant.

Bee Branch Watershed Project 
The year 1999 saw a flood that prompted the city to research an engineering project on the 100-year flood area. The year of 1999, along with 2002, 2004, 2008, 2010, and 2011, collectively saw devastating floods, prompting six presidential disaster declarations with estimated costs around $70 million. The city reacting to this, started the Bee Branch Watershed Project.

The Bee Branch Watershed Flood Mitigation Project is a "multi-phased" project aimed at reducing flash flooding, improving water quality, and improving the quality of life in the creek's watershed. The Iowa Department of Homeland Security and Emergency Management (Iowa HSEMD) lists twelve phases.

The Lower Bee Branch Creek Restoration Project is phase four. It includes a large pond and a few overlooks in an old industrial park. The Upper Bee Branch Creek Restoration is phase seven. It is also known as the Greenway. It is designed to direct stormwater into the creek.

It was found that the storm sewer did not have the capacity for storms of that size. Detention basins were added to limit flooding. The Bee Branch storm sewer was daylighted into the Bee Branch Creek, not only as a flood prevention system but also as a community asset and to replace the lost ecosystem. The creek is more open than its previous sewer design, allowing a greater volume of water to be carried.

Throughout the 2000s, the project was being planned including with citizen hearings in 2003, acquisitions of the affected properties in 2005, and designing in 2008. The project did receive backlash. Citizens worried the daylighted creek would be ugly or unsafe. In 2010, the Lower Bee Branch Restoration was started and it ended by June 2015. Construction on the Upper Bee Branch Restoration started in 2015 and was completed December 2016. About 100 pieces of property were bought by the city. The storm sewer was also expanded, with the town adding trench drains. The renovations closed W. 17th street for about a month and a half, from May 3 to June 22, 2021. The city also tried to minimize impermeable surfaces causing flooding by converting alleyways into permeable sections. The conversion is expected to cost $9.5 million and be completed in December 2033.

In 2017, the Bee Branch adverted a flood when  of rain fell.

By October 2021, the city had finished building culverts under the Canadian Pacific Railway (CPR) to route the creek through. A walkway was finished by 2022. This event was commemorated as the finishing the restoration project. However, the Bee Branch Watershed Project is not expected to be completed until 2040. Even after this declaration of completion, in November 2022, a $3 million project to make a new drainage sewer to replace the temporary siphon sewer. The siphon system had maintenance issues according to a worker. The city was unable to put in the replacement earlier due to a lack of finances.

State and federal contributions have made up the bulk of the funding, with contributions from the city and the Iowa Flood Mitigation Program.

The entire flood prevention project is expected to cost about $230 million with the creek restoration taking up $107.9 million. The Iowa HSEMD gave an estimated cost of $248,242,053.

Outcome 
Overall the project has prevented $11.6 million in damages.

The Atlantic covered an article on it, interviewing mayor Roy D. Buol. The project also inspired Middletown, Pennsylvania, who was also struggling with floods. Also, the project was used to resist the Blacksnake Combined Sewer Overflow. Protesters used the Bee Branch as what the Blacksnake Creek could become. However, supporters said Blacksnake Creek was very different.

Geography 
The creek originates in the suburbia, just past Eisenhower Elementary, then flows into the Carter Street Detention Basin and 32nd Street Detention Basin in the Couler Valley. The Upper Bee Branch comes from the old sewer and feeds the lower Bee Branch. The culvert that feeds the Upper Bee Branch comes from those detention basins deeper in town. The Bee Branch is split into two sections by the Canadian Pacific Railway and Garfield Avenue. The Lower Bee Branch goes out into the Mississippi.

The geography of the north end of Dubuque, specifically its steepness, makes it more likely for floods to happen. This is made more extreme due to Dubuque covering permeable surfaces with asphalt.

Crossings 

The Bee Branch is crossed by 22nd street and Rhomberg in the upper part and Sycamore Street and 16th Street in the lower section and Garfield and the CPR separates the upper and lower sections. Dubuque commissioned Origin Design to plan and build up the bridges of the upper and lower sections.

Bee Branch Creek Greenway 
The Bee Branch Creek Greenway is a large, linear park along the creek. The greenway includes a playground, an amphitheater, a garden, a bioswale, benches, lighting, and rest areas. The trails also go under the nearby rails through a pedestrian tunnel.

Environment 
It is expected that the creek will maintain a healthy ecosystem. In the Lower Bee Branch, 14 native species of fish and the common carp have been found in it. Many of these fish are game fish including: bluegill, largemouth bass, and northern pike. The DNR considered the ecosystem healthy considering the newness of the stream.

Floating islands 
In July 2017, the city of Dubuque installed 14 floating islands in the creek between 16th street and the US Route 151/61 overpass. They provide habitats and pull excess nutrients out of the water, like phosphorus, nitrogen, and floating sediments. The rafts are made from recycled BPA-free polyethylene terephthalate plastic, which is also used in plastic bottles.

The islands have multiple layers that provide various habitats. For example, a top layer for pollinators and animals that sit on the rafts or a lower layer for fish to eat off the roots. Due to having native plants, the islands will not have to be removed during winter. Some types of plants on the island includes: sedges, blue flag iris, marsh marigold. The plants anchoring the islands to the ground means that they can change with water levels.

Mussels 
On June 11, 2020, 2,500 freshwater mussels, given by the United States Fish and Wildlife Service, were released into the Bee Branch. The plan was that they would be used to clean up the water. In past years, the Iowa DNR have been making an effort to return mussel populations to waterways. The mussels were split into two groups. The 1st group would be placed in rearing silos. The 2nd group would be released in groups of 500 throughout the creek.

However, about a week later, on June 18, 2020, Gavilon Grain spilled 2 containers with a million gallons of liquid nitrogen fertilizer into the Bee Branch. An estimated  of fertilizer was spilled into a storm drain that flows into the Bee Branch. The accident was caused by a mistake transferring nitrogen, with the receiving tank overfilling. The transfer was not being watched nor was the spill immediately reported.  This severely damaged the mussel population, causing the largest mussel kill in the state and killed numerous fish. They died to the high concentrations of ammonia. A second killing happened as the leftover fertilizer was washed back into the Bee Branch.

The company was fined $270,000. The largest fine of $244,705 was issued to restore giant floater and plain pocketbook mussels. They also agreed to pay $18,828 for fish restoration. An administrative penalty of $7,000 was issued by the DNR. This is lower than is required to be issued under Iowa law.

Gavilon made a "three-pronged plan" to clean the Bee Branch. First, they would pump air into the southeast area of the basin. Second, they would recirculate water in the affected area. Thirdly, they asked the DNR for permission to flush the sewer to remove any ammonia left in there.

See also

Dubuque Arboretum and Botanical Gardens – A park in the North End
Eagle Point Park – Another park in the North End
History of Dubuque, Iowa
Lock and Dam No. 11
Rivers of Iowa
Catfish Creek – A creek to the south of the Bee Branch

References 

Dubuque, Iowa
Rivers of Iowa
Parks in Dubuque, Iowa
Rivers of Dubuque County, Iowa